The 1982–83 Alabama Crimson Tide men's basketball team represented the University of Alabama in the 1982–83 NCAA Division I men's basketball season. The team's head coach was Wimp Sanderson, who was in his third season at Alabama. The team played their home games at Coleman Coliseum in Tuscaloosa, Alabama. They finished the season 18–12, 8–10 in SEC play, and finished in a tie for eighth place.

The key freshman signee was forward Alphonso "Buck" Johnson from Hayes High School in Birmingham, Alabama.

It was an odd year for Sanderson and the Tide.  They opened the season with eight consecutive wins, including a victory over Patrick Ewing and 10th ranked Georgetown, who had reached the NCAA Finals the season before.   Once conference play began, the Tide struggled, notably losing to Vanderbilt and Ole Miss each twice.  Even so, the Tide still managed to post wins over nationally ranked Kentucky (#3) and top-ranked UCLA.

The Tide reached the SEC tournament final and lost to Georgia.  They received an at-large bid to the 1983 NCAA Division I men's basketball tournament, and lost in the first round to Lamar.

Roster

Schedule and results

|-
!colspan=9 style=| Regular season

|-
!colspan=9 style=| SEC Tournament

|-
!colspan=9 style=| NCAA Tournament

Rankings

References 

Alabama Crimson Tide men's basketball seasons
Alabama
Alabama
1982 in sports in Alabama
1983 in sports in Alabama